Melese dorothea is a moth of the family Erebidae. It was described by Caspar Stoll in 1782. It is found in French Guiana, Suriname, Brazil, Paraguay, Ecuador, Peru and Panama.

References

 

Melese
Moths described in 1782